Green Garden Township may refer to:

 Green Garden Township, Will County, Illinois
 Green Garden Township, Ellsworth County, Kansas

Township name disambiguation pages